Bryan Alexander is an American futurist, Georgetown University Senior Scholar and the creator of The Future of Higher Education Observatory. Alexander was one of the first experts to envision the peak in US higher education enrollment and is a key contributor to the academic and popular culture conversation about higher education. Alexander hosts the Future Trends Forum that invites thought leaders to discuss technology and culture in higher education. He writes and speaks extensively about global climate change, social networking, digital literacy, digital storytelling, mobile learning, and emerging technology in higher education and is the author of Academia Next: The Futures of Higher Education. Bryan Alexander's upcoming book is Universities on Fire: Higher Education in the Age of Climate Crisis.

Early life and career

Bryan Alexander was born and raised in New York City.  He earned his bachelors, masters, and Ph.D. degrees from the University of Michigan.  He began his career as an Assistant Professor of English at Centenary College of Louisiana before moving to Vermont to lead the Center of Educational Technology at Middlebury College.  He then worked for many years for the National Institute for Technology in Liberal Education (NITLE) as a senior director.  

In 2013, Mr. Alexander began his independent consultancy as a higher education futurist. 

Alexander lived for many years in rural Vermont in a house that used woodstoves for heat, for which he chopped and split wood.  He adopted aspects of a homesteader or "prepper" lifestyle during this time.  In 2018 'Ozy' magazine referred to him as an "Ax-Wielding Futurist"

In Academia Next (2020), Alexander's work, written before the COVID-19 pandemic described the possibilities and challenges of a pandemic upon higher education.

In 2021, Alexander contributed a chapter to the book Media, Technology and Education in a Post-Truth Society: From Fake News, Datafication and Mass Surveillance to the Death of Trust.

Alexander is currently one of nine members on Association of Professional Futurists (APF) international board.

Key ideas
One of Alexander's most salient ideas is about the "academic queen sacrifice." Alexander argues that US higher education has been reducing the numbers and the power of academic workers, and this puts higher education in peril.

Future Trends Forum

Since 2016, Bryan Alexander has been hosting Future Trends Forum, an open video conversation about the future of higher education.  Each week, Alexander has a different guest: "an inspiring expert, visionary, practitioner, or researcher – discussing their area of interest."  Audience members are encouraged to ask questions and in some cases go on stage with the guest. Future Trends Forum guests have included Anya Kamenetz, Cory Doctorow, Terri Givens, and John Katzman.

Academia Next:The Futures of Higher Education
Academia Next: The Futures of Higher Education covers several trends including: demographic transition, escalating economic inequality, rising campus costs and student debt, open education (OER, open access), increasing multimedia tools, platforms, content, creativity, and rising automation. It also covers alternate scenarios including, Health Care Nation, Peak Higher Education, Renaissance, and the Retro Campus. The book received an award from the Association of Professional Futurists (APF) in 2020. Academia Next, written in 2018 and published in January 2020, included a pandemic scenario, presaging the COVID-19 pandemic.

Universities on Fire:Higher Education in the Age of Climate Crisis
Universities on Fire is scheduled for publication by Johns Hopkins University Press in March 2023. Alexander examines human-induced climate change as a major factor reshaping colleges and universities.According to Joshua Kim at Inside Higher Education, the book "will be a conversation about the future of higher education through the lenses of extreme weather, energy transitions and institutional resilience."

See also
Climate change
Digital storytelling
Educational technology
Educause
Futurology
Higher education in the US

External links
Bryan Alexander.org
Future Trends Forum

References

Place of birth missing (living people)
Living people
American futurologists
American non-fiction writers
1967 births